The Alazeya Plateau is a mountain plateau in the Sakha Republic, Far Eastern Federal District, Russia. The area is named after river Alazeya, which has its source in the plateau.

There are kigilyakhs in the Alazeya Plateau. The particularity of the kigilyakhs found in this location is that their lower part (corresponding to the legs) is thinner than the upper part.

Geography  
The Alazeya Plateau is located in eastern Sakha Republic, between the Indigirka, Kolyma, Alazeya and Ozhogina rivers.

The plateau is limited by the Yana-Indigirka Lowland, including the Aby Lowland, to the west, with rivers Yana and Indigirka, the Ozhogina to the south, and the Kolyma Lowland with the Kolyma to the east and northeast. Besides the Alazeya, the Sededema and the Shangina also have their sources in the plateau.

There are forests of larch in the lower areas and mountain tundra in the higher altitudes.

References

External links
Physiogeography of the Russian Far East
Wetlands in Russia - Vol.4

Plateaus of the Sakha Republic